Paulo César de Souza (born 16 February 1979),  known as just Paulo César, is a Brazilian footballer.

Career
He played for Jeonbuk Hyundai Motors in 2005. He was League Cup Top Assists Award winner. 
He played 3 matches in League and 9 matches in League Cup.

Honours

Individual
Korean League Cup Top Assists Award: 2004

References

External links

1979 births
Living people
Brazilian footballers
Campeonato Brasileiro Série A players
Campeonato Brasileiro Série B players
K League 1 players
Jeonbuk Hyundai Motors players
Brazilian expatriate footballers
Expatriate footballers in South Korea
Brazilian expatriate sportspeople in South Korea
Association football midfielders